The Earls of Leicester is an American bluegrass group, assembled by Jerry Douglas in 2013 to present the music of Lester Flatt, Earl Scruggs and their band the Foggy Mountain Boys to a contemporary audience. Their eponymous debut album earned a Grammy Award for Best Bluegrass Album in 2015.

The band's name is a play on words:  The English city Leicester is pronounced "Lester", the same as Flatt's first name, and Scruggs' first name is "Earl".

Members

Current
 Jerry Douglas - Dobro
 Shawn Camp - lead vocals and guitar
 Charlie Cushman - banjo and guitars
 Johnny Warren - vocals and fiddle 
 Daniel Kimbro - vocals and bass
 Jeff White -  mandolin and vocals

Former
 Tim O'Brien
 Barry Bales

Discography

Awards
The Earls and their engineer/mixer, Bil Vorndick, received a Grammy Award in 2014 for Best Bluegrass Album for their album The Earls of Leicester.

References

American bluegrass music groups
Grammy Award winners
Musical groups established in 2013
Musical groups from Nashville, Tennessee
Rounder Records artists
American supergroups
2013 establishments in Tennessee